Virendra is a given name. Notable people with the name include:

Birendra Sutradhar (1937–1961), Bengali language activist who was martyred on 19 May 1961
Virendra Bhatia, politician and Member of the Parliament of India
Virendra Kumar (born 1954), member of the 14th Lok Sabha of India
Virendra Kumar Baranwal (born 1941), Hindi language writer and poet
Virendra Kumar Sakhlecha, chief minister of the Indian state of Madhya Pradesh
Virendra Saxena, Indian theater, film and television actor
Virendra Sharma (born 1947), British Labour Party politician and Member of Parliament for Ealing Southall
Virendra Swarup, Member and Chairman of Legislative Council of Uttar Pradesh, India and an educationist